István Kausz (18 August 1932 – 3 June 2020) was a Hungarian fencer. He won a gold medal in the team épée event at the 1964 Summer Olympics.

Born in Budapest, Kausz competed for Budapest Vasas Sports Club before moving to Budapest Progress and then finally moving to OSC in 1957 until 1970 when he retired. Kausz started out as a pentathlete, he would later just concentrate on the Épée form of fencing.

Kausz was part of the Hungarian team that won the épée team gold at the 1959 World Fencing Championships, which was held in his home city of Budapest, the following year he competed in the 1960 Summer Olympics. In the individual épée event, Kausz managed to get through three rounds before finishing last in his semi-final group, in the team épée, the team reached the semi-finals before losing to Great Britain and then lost to the Soviet Union team in the contest for the bronze medal.

In between his Olympic appearances, Kausz won the individual gold medal at the 1962 World Fencing Championships.

At the 1964 Summer Olympics, Kausz only managed to reach the second round in the individual épée, but in the team épée, with fellow countrymen, Győző Kulcsár, Zoltán Nemere, Tamás Gábor and Árpád Bárány, went all the way to the final and beat the Italian team to win the gold medal.

During his sporting years Kausz also managed to earn a degree in medicine and would later become a doctor for the Hungarian swimming team, and was part of the Hungarian Olympic medical team for six summer Olympics.

References

External links
 

1932 births
2020 deaths
Hungarian male épée fencers
Olympic fencers of Hungary
Fencers at the 1960 Summer Olympics
Fencers at the 1964 Summer Olympics
Olympic gold medalists for Hungary
Olympic medalists in fencing
Martial artists from Budapest
Medalists at the 1964 Summer Olympics
Universiade medalists in fencing
Universiade gold medalists for Hungary
Medalists at the 1959 Summer Universiade
20th-century Hungarian people
21st-century Hungarian people